Theenda Theenda is a 2006 Indian Tamil language drama film directed by A. B. Mughan. The film stars newcomer Shivhasan, Vinod, Preethi Varma and newcomer Shravya Sudhakar, with  Vijayan, Rajesh, Vadivukkarasi, Sethu Vinayagam, Kumarimuthu, Priyanka, Gemini Rajeshwari, and Gowthami Vembunathan playing supporting roles. The film, produced by A. S. Maryson, had musical score by Shankar–Ganesh and was released on 7 April 2006.

Plot
Azhagesan (Shivhasan) is a jobless youngster and chain smoker who spends his time roaming with his friends in the village. His mother Ponnatha (Vadivukkarasi) loves him more than anything and spoils him, while his father Paramasivam (Rajesh) hates him for being a wastrel. Azhagesan and Deivanai (Shravya), the daughter of the village bigwig Ramasamy (Sethu Vinayagam), fall in love with each other. Their love affair crosses through mild hassles, like when Deivanai's cousin Vinod (Vinod), an army man on a trip to his village, seeks her hand in marriage. Vinod realises that she is in love with him, so Anand genuinely accepts their love and leaves the village. Meanwhile, Azhagesan's cousin Valli (Preethi Varma) arrives at his village and starts to woo him. Meanwhile, the villagers decide to not consume alcohol until the end of the village festival. The last day of the festival, the angry arrack traders create a ruckus in the village. The huts of the villagers catch fire, and many villagers have died, including Deivanai.

The incident disturbs the peace of the place causing friction between two communities. The fire was, in fact, caused by Azhagesan who had inadvertently tossed out his cigarette butt in a haystack that day. When the villagers come to know about it, they beat him up. A remorseful Azhagesan begs them to kill him for his carelessness, but they let him go. The film ends with a saddened Azhagesan leaving the village.

Cast

Shivhasan as Azhagesan
Vinod as Vinod
Preethi Varma as Valli
Shravya Sudhakar as Deivanai
Vijayan as Village President
Rajesh as Paramasivam
Vadivukkarasi as Ponnatha
Sethu Vinayagam as Ramasamy
Kumarimuthu as Villager
Gowthami Vembunathan as Deivanai's mother
Gemini Rajeshwari as Deivanai's grandmother
Priyanka as Marikozhundhu
Scissor Manohar as Thar Road
Crane Manohar as Puli Moottai
Vellai Subbaiah as Villager
Munnar Ramesh
Master Udayaraj as Vandu
M. P. Paul as Bell
Raani
Frank Kothas
Muniraj
Kalai
Udumalai Royal Karthik
Vandar Kuzhazhi Smitha in a special appearance
Risha in a special appearance

Production
A. B. Mughan made his directorial debut with Theenda Theenda under the banner of Maryson Films. The new faces Shivhasan and Sharvya (Kavitha) who won the Fairever Miss South India (2003), were selected to play the lead roles alongside Vinod and Preethi Varma.

Soundtrack

The film score and the soundtrack were composed by Shankar–Ganesh. The soundtrack, released in 2006, features 6 tracks written by Thamizhnathan, Gopal Daasan and A. B. Mughan.

Reception
Malini Mannath said, "It's a film with a relevant message no doubt, fairly well communicated, but with a lot more room for improvement in the crafting of it".

References

2006 films
2000s Tamil-language films
Indian drama films
Films scored by Shankar–Ganesh
2006 directorial debut films
Films about smoking
2006 drama films